Georgios Giannelis (born 24 July 1971) is a Greek middle-distance runner. He competed in the men's 3000 metres steeplechase at the 2000 Summer Olympics.

References

1971 births
Living people
Athletes (track and field) at the 2000 Summer Olympics
Greek male middle-distance runners
Greek male steeplechase runners
Olympic athletes of Greece
Place of birth missing (living people)